MegaCon, short for Mega Convention, is a large speculative fiction convention that caters to the comic book, sci-fi, anime, fantasy, RPG, and gaming communities, often occurring in spring at the Orange County Convention Center in Orlando, Florida. The convention is the largest Fan convention event in the Southern United States and second largest in the US with an attendance of 140,000 recorded in 2022.

History

Founding 
The first comic book convention held in the Orlando area was OrlandoCon, held annually from 1974 to c. 1994. Regular guests included C. C. Beck, Floyd Gottfredson, and Hal Foster.

MegaCon was founded by James Breitbiel and first held in 1993. The convention was acquired by the Tampa-based publisher CrossGen in 1999, with Elizabeth Widera brought on to run the show in 2000. (Breitbiel became CrossGen's Marketing and Distribution Director.) During this period, from 2000 to 2003, MegaCon heavily promoted CrossGen products and creators, to the frustration of some other exhibitors and attendees, although the show itself grew and thrived.

In late 2003, Widera purchased the convention from the failing CrossGen, which was restructuring (the publisher went bankrupt in 2004). Widera, who is a board member of the comics charity The Hero Initiative, currently runs the show along with her daughter Christine Alger.

In September 2008, MegaCon headquarters moved from Safety Harbor to Live Oak, Florida, although the actual convention remains in Orlando.

In 2009, in addition to the main show, held February 27–March 1, convention organizers produced a "mini-MegaCon" held August 22–23, the only one to date, featuring a number of actors from the Buffy the Vampire Slayer TV show.

In 2010, the Orlando area entertainment company Moshi Moshi Productions started to host adult evening afterparties in conjunction with the event at nearby hotels. In 2017, MegaCon began to officiate the afterparties. Said parties are often themed to a specific fandom or group of fandoms. The first party is usually held at the Icebar Orlando with subsequent night parties at the Rosen Plaza and Rosen Centre.

Fan Expo

On April 7, 2015, it was announced that MegaCon had been sold to Informa. The con now operates under the auspices of Informa's Fan Expo group, which also runs Fan Expo Canada, Fan Expo Dallas, and Fan Expo Boston. Unlike other conventions of Fan Expo, MegaCon has retained it's existing name rather than being renamed to "Orlando Fan Expo".
Following Megacon 2015 it was announced that for the first time Megacon will be extended to 4 days in 2016.
Shortly after Megacon 2016, Megacon Tampa Bay was announced for October 28–30. MegaCon Tampa last happened in 2018 and has not returned since due to the increasing sizes of convention rivals Tampa Bay Comic Con and Metrocon as well as the size limitations of the Tampa Convention Center.

The 2020 event was cancelled due to the COVID-19 pandemic. Initially planned to be held April 16–19 and June 4–7, it was replaced by a smaller "limited edition" "mini-MegaCon" with the next main event to be held on March 18–21, 2021. These dates were also cancelled with the next date, August 12–15 being a return to operations, though masks were mandated as a measure to quell an outbreak of COVID-19. The 2021 event was plagued with many guest cancellations due to pandemic-caused filming conflicts affecting many including Elijah Wood, Brendan Fraser, and James Marsters who were to be among the headline celebrities of the event.

2022 featured a return to normal operations with Elijah Wood, Sean Astin, Dominic Monaghan, and Billy Boyd, the Hobbits of the Lord of the Rings, reuniting on stage as well as Kevin Smith and Jason Mewes of the Jay and Silent Bob show, Brendan Fraser, and Gina Carano being other highlight guest appearances. Numerous traffic issues in the surrounding areas due to record attendance reached local news headlines. Several tiers of tickets including family packages and youth tickets were sold out on Saturday. Surpassing Comic Con International's attendance cap of 130,000, MegaCon became the second most attended fan convention in the United States after New York Comic Con. The last day of the 2022 convention hosted a memorial service for the late comic artist George Perez, who was a frequent guest at the convention.

Dates and guests

90's and 2000's

2010's

Post-Covid

Events 

Events include the Indy Film Festival, annual cosplay/costume contests, all-genre costume contest, panels, and rave dances. MegaCon also offers attendees the option of game playing. Current game systems offered are Dungeons & Dragons living campaigns, Living Forgotten Realms, Pathfinder Society and Legends of the Shining Jewel. Other non-campaign role playing games are offered. Magic: The Gathering is also offered in a card room, and board and strategic games are often on the dealer floor. E-gaming tournaments are also held at the event for games like Super Smash Bros.

Since 2001, MegaCon has also been the location of the long-running "Paranoia LIVE!" LARP, based on Mongoose Publishing's Paranoia.

In 2007, MegaCon hosted the first live presentation of the Web Cartoonists' Choice Awards.

In August 2008 MegaCon announced that it would host the first inaugural Project Fanboy Awards ceremony, awarding authors, writers and publishers with honors voted on by Internet users on the Project Fanboy website. The Project Fanboy Awards are now an ongoing event.

Beginning with 2018, MegaCon has been host of the Sunshine qualifier of FanExpo's Masters of Cosplay Grand Prix.

Starting in 2022, MegaCon inaugurated FanExpo's partnership with virtual auction site WhatNot, featuring a Virtual MegaCon with virtual celebrity signings, comic artist sketch streams, and streams of cosplay contests, as well as a WhatNot booth.

References

External links
 
 MegaCon at About.com

Multigenre conventions
Comics conventions in the United States
Fan conventions
Culture of Orlando, Florida
Recurring events established in 1993
Conventions in Florida
1993 establishments in Florida